María Camila Osorio Serrano defeated Tamara Zidanšek in the final, 5–7, 6–3, 6–4, to win the singles tennis title at the 2021 Copa Colsanitas. It was the Colombian teenage wildcard's first career Women's Tennis Association (WTA) singles title. Ranked No. 180, Osorio Serrano became the lowest-ranked WTA title holder since world No. 299 Margarita Gasparyan at the 2018 Tashkent Open. Zidanšek was also in contention for her first WTA title.

Amanda Anisimova was the defending champion from when the tournament was last held in 2019, but chose to participate in Charleston instead.

Seeds

Draw

Finals

Top half

Bottom half

Qualifying

Seeds

Qualifiers

Draw

First qualifier

Second qualifier

Third qualifier

Fourth qualifier

Fifth qualifier

Sixth qualifier

References

External Links
Main Draw
Qualifying Draw

2021 WTA Tour
2021 Copa Colsanitas – 1